In medicine, a stent is a metal or plastic tube inserted into the lumen of an anatomic vessel or duct to keep the passageway open, and stenting is the placement of a stent. A wide variety of stents are used for different purposes, from expandable coronary, vascular and biliary stents, to simple plastic stents that allow urine to flow between kidney and bladder. "Stent" is also used as a verb to describe the placement of such a device, particularly when a disease such as atherosclerosis has pathologically narrowed a structure such as an artery.

A stent is different from a shunt. A shunt is a tube that connects two previously unconnected parts of the body to allow fluid to flow between them. Stents and shunts can be made of similar materials, but perform two different tasks.

Stent types

Etymology
The current accepted origin of the word stent is that it derives from the name of an English dentist, Charles Thomas Stent (1807–1885), notable for his advances in the field of denture-making. A dentist in London, he is most famous for improving and modifying the denture base of the gutta-percha, creating the stent's compounding that made it practical as a material for dental impressions. Others attribute the noun stent to Jan F. Esser, a Dutch plastic surgeon who in 1916 used the word to describe a dental impression compound invented in 1856 by Charles Stent, whom Esser employed to craft a form for facial reconstruction. The full account is described in the Journal of the History of Dentistry.  According to the author, from the use of Stent's compound as a support for facial tissues evolved the use of a stent to hold open various body structures.

The verb form "stenting" was used for centuries to describe the process of stiffening garments (a usage long obsolete, per the Oxford English Dictionary), and some believe this to be the origin. According to the Merriam Webster Third New International Dictionary, the noun evolved from the Middle English verb stenten, shortened from extenten 'to stretch', which in turn came from Latin extentus, the past participle of extendō 'to stretch out'.

The first (self-expanding) "stents" used in medical practice in 1986 by Ulrich Sigwart in Lausanne were initially called "Wallstents" after their inventor, Hans Wallstén.
Julio Palmaz et al. created a balloon-expandable stent that is currently used.

History 
That stent was used as a scaffold to prevent a vessel from closing and to avoid restenosis in coronary surgery—a condition where scar tissue grows within the stent and interferes with vascular flow. Shortly thereafter, in 1987, Julio Palmaz (known for patenting a balloon-expandable stent ) and Richard Schatz implanted their similar stent into a patient in Germany.

Though several doctors have been credited with the creation of the stent, the first FDA-approved stent in the U.S. was created by Richard Schatz and coworkers. Named the Palmaz-Schatz (Johnson & Johnson), it was developed in 1987.

To further reduce the incidence of restenosis, the drug-eluting stent was introduced in 2003. Research has led to general stent design changes and improvements since that time. Bioresorbable scaffolds have also entered the market, though a large-scale clinical trial showed higher acute risks compared to drug-eluding stents. As a result, the FDA issued an official warning for their use in 2013, and research on the design and performance optimisation of stents is ongoing.

See also 

 Bioresorbable stent
 Bronchoscopy
 Colonoscopy
 Esophagogastroduodenoscopy
 Grommet
 Interventional radiology
 Multi-artery

References

External links 

 Coronary Stent
 Drug-Eluting Stents — Angioplasty.Org
 Cardiovascular and Interventional Radiological Society of Europe
 The Cardiovascular Forum
 Stent for Life Initiative

Implants (medicine)
Interventional radiology
Medical devices